International Media Distribution (IMD) (formerly International Networks), a division of NBCUniversal, is a leading provider of in-language networks which facilitates the distribution of Asian, European, Middle Eastern and Hispanic channels and Video On Demand services across all platforms including, cable, satellite and OTT.

History
Originally launched as International Channel Networks in 1996, the company was owned by Liberty Media (which was the majority owner with a 90% stake) and JJS II Communications, LLC (which owned the remaining 10% share). They owned and operated The International Channel or I-Channel, which was a basic cable channel that launched in 1990 and featured multilingual, multi-ethnic programming to audiences in the United States. The channel offered programming from Europe, Asia & the Middle East in over 25 languages. In 1998, the company began offering a tier of premium networks featuring various channels from around the world. This tier has since grown and currently consists of over 50 networks. 
 
In July 2004, as part of a larger deal, International Channel Networks was sold to Comcast. In 2005, Comcast re-branded the International Channel as AZN Television, a channel catering to Asian Americans and featuring several original programmes. The company was subsequently renamed International Networks.

On April 9, 2008, AZN television ceased operations as Comcast decided to shut down the channel due to distribution and advertising difficulties.

On March 10, 2009, Comcast decided to rename the company as International Media Distribution''. The re-brand was undertaken to reflect the growth of the company and to emphasize the focus which is now on the distribution of premium international channels from around the world. In 2011, Comcast completed its purchase of NBCUniversal, thereafter IMD was reorganized under the international television distribution arm of NBCUniversal rather than the Comcast Entertainment Group.

Premium Television Networks

Current
International Media Distribution’s portfolio includes over 50 networks from across the world including:  

Arabic
 ART America

Chinese
 CCTV-4
 CGTN Documentary
 CTI-Zhong Tian Channel
 Phoenix North America Chinese Channel
 Phoenix InfoNews Channel
Phoenix Hong Kong Channel (Cantonese)
CGTN (English)

Filipino
The Filipino Channel (TFC)
Myx TV (English)
ABS-CBN News Channel
Cinema One
Lifestyle Network

French
TV5MONDE
TV5MONDE Cinema On Demand
Tivi5MONDE
TV5MONDE Info
TV5MONDE Style
German
 DW Deutsch+

Greek
 ANT1 Satellite

Italian
 Mediaset Italia

Japanese
 TV JAPAN

Korean
 TVK
TVK2
TVK-Pop On Demand

Polish
 TVP Polonia

Russian
 Channel One Russia
Dom Kino Premium
TeleCafe
 RTN
 RTN+
THT

South Asian
 ABP News
Eros Now (Subscription VOD)
 TV Asia
 Aapka Colors
 Colors Rishtey
 MTV India
 Colors Cineplex
 Colors Tamil
 Colors Kannada
 Colors Bangla
 Colors Marathi
 News 18

Spanish

Cinema Dinamita
 Picardia Nacional
 PX Sports
 VePlus

Vietnamese
 SBTN

References

External links
 

NBCUniversal
Television networks in the United States
Companies based in Colorado